Dr Susan Bissell is Canadian academic and human rights advocate, working as a visiting scholar and senior fellow at the FXB Centre for Health & Human Rights, T.H. Chan School of Public Health of Harvard University. Prior to this appointment, her thirty-year career with the United Nations Children's Fund (UNICEF) was centered on protecting the rights, safety, and security of children throughout the world.

Bissell obtained her first two degrees from the University of Toronto, and her PhD in public health and medical anthropology from the University of Melbourne. As an advocate for children, Bissell served as UNICEF's global lead on Child Protection, and was the founding director of the Global Partnership to End Violence Against Children.

Bissell's current board memberships include Cure Violence Global, Global Child and the FIFA Human Rights Advisory Board.  With an interest in documentary film-making, she collaborated with Trudie Styler and the Bangladeshi team of Catherine and Tareque Masud to produce A Kind of Childhood, for television and the Human Rights Watch Film Festival. Currently, Bissell is an Executive Producer of Running to Stand Still / Heart of the Matter, focusing on migration around the world, the exploitation of men, women and children, and the people on the front lines respecting their dignity and humanity.

References

Child crime victim advocates
Anti–human trafficking activists
Living people
Adoption workers
Sexual abuse victim advocates
UNICEF people
Canadian officials of the United Nations
Year of birth missing (living people)